Pamela Mary Brown (8 July 1917 – 19 September 1975) was a British actress.

Early life
She was born in Hampstead, London, to George Edward Brown, a journalist, and his wife, Helen Blanche (née Ellerton). Raised in the Roman Catholic faith, she attended St Mary's School, Ascot.

Career
After attending the Royal Academy of Dramatic Art she made her stage debut in 1936 as Juliet in a Stratford-upon-Avon production of Romeo and Juliet. Three of her early film roles were in Powell and Pressburger films: her first screen part in One of Our Aircraft Is Missing (1942), a memorable supporting role in I Know Where I'm Going! (1945), and in the fantasy film-opera The Tales of Hoffmann (1951). She played a bitter spinster in Personal Affair, starring Gene Tierney (1953).

From the early 1950s, her arthritic condition (first appearing when she was sixteen) began to make playing on the stage difficult; her mobility was restricted and she was in great pain, which was kept at bay by drugs. Nevertheless, she was a notable success as Jennet in the London production of Christopher Fry's The Lady's Not For Burning, opposite Richard Burton, Claire Bloom and John Gielgud (1949), which transferred to Broadway for an extended run (1950–51). Time magazine wrote (20 November 1950): "As the lady, Pamela Brown proves that Fry did not write the part for her in vain. No one has a more gloriously uppity charm; no voice can simultaneously so rasp and thrill; no one ever made standoffishness more come-hitherable."

Her success in film continued as Jane Shore in Laurence Olivier's Richard III (1955) and opposite Kirk Douglas in the Van Gogh biopic Lust for Life (1956). Highlights of her 1960s work include the epic Cleopatra (High Priestess; 1963), Becket (Eleanor of Aquitaine; 1964) and A Funny Thing Happened on the Way to the Forum (High Priestess; 1966).  She played Lady Bessborough in Lady Caroline Lamb (1972) and Archduchess Sophia of Austria in Fall of Eagles (1974).

Personal life
In February 1953, she divorced her husband, Peter Copley, for infidelity. They had no children. A devout Roman Catholic, she could not remarry while Copley was still alive but chose to live with her partner Michael Powell, the director who had given her her early film roles. They remained together until her death from pancreatic cancer in 1975, aged 58, in Avening, Gloucestershire. She was buried in Holy Cross churchyard, Avening.

Complete filmography

 One of Our Aircraft Is Missing (1942) as Els Meertens
 I Know Where I'm Going! (1945) as Catriona
 Death of a Rat (1946 TV movie) as Yolan
 Alice in Wonderland (1949) as The Queen of Hearts (voice)
 The Tales of Hoffmann (1951) as Nicklaus
 The Second Mrs. Tanqueray (1952) as Paula Tanqueray
 Personal Affair (1953) as Evelyn
 Baker's Dozen (1955 TV movie) as Mrs. Carewe
 Richard III (1955) as Jane Shore
 Now and Forever (1956) as Mrs. Grant
 Lust for Life (1956) as Christine
 Dark Possession (1959 TV movie) as Charlotte Bell Wheeler
 The Scapegoat (1959) as Blanche
 The House in Paris (1959 TV movie) as Naomi 
 Victoria Regina (1961 TV movie) as Duchess of Kent

 Cleopatra (1963) as High Priestess
 Espionage (TV series) (1963) - 'Never Turn Your Back on a Friend' - as Miss. Jensen
 Becket (1964) as Eleanor of Aquitaine
 The Importance of Being Earnest (1964 Armchair Theatre TV movie) as Lady Bracknell
 The Witness (1966 TV movie) as Madame Pontreau
 A Funny Thing Happened on the Way to the Forum (1966) as High Priestess
 Half a Sixpence (1967) as Mrs. Washington
 The Admirable Crichton (1968 TV movie) as Lady Brocklehurst
 Secret Ceremony (1968) as Hilda
 On a Clear Day You Can See Forever (1970) as Mrs. Fitzherbert
 Figures in a Landscape (1970) as Widow
 Wuthering Heights (1970) as Mrs. Linton
 The Night Digger (1971) as Mrs. Edith Prince
 Lady Caroline Lamb or Peccato d'amore (1972) as Lady Bessborough
 Dracula (1974 TV movie) as Mrs. Westenra
 In This House of Brede (1975 TV movie) as Dame Agnes

References

External links
 
 
 

1917 births
1975 deaths
20th-century English actresses
Alumni of RADA
Deaths from cancer in England
Deaths from pancreatic cancer
English Roman Catholics
English film actresses
English stage actresses
English television actresses
English voice actresses
Outstanding Performance by a Supporting Actress in a Drama Series Primetime Emmy Award winners
People educated at St Mary's School, Ascot
People from Avening
People from Hampstead